Corporal George Washington Clute (June 11, 1842 to February 13, 1919) was an American soldier who fought in the American Civil War. Clute received the country's highest award for bravery during combat, the Medal of Honor, for his action during the Battle of Bentonville in North Carolina on 19 March 1865. He was honored with the award on 26 August 1898.

Biography
Clute was born in Marathon Township, Michigan on 11 June 1842. He enlisted into the 14th Michigan Infantry. He died on 13 February 1919 and his remains are interred at the Mount Morris Cemetery in Mount Morris, Michigan.

Medal of Honor citation

See also

List of American Civil War Medal of Honor recipients: A–F

References

1842 births
1919 deaths
People of Michigan in the American Civil War
Union Army officers
United States Army Medal of Honor recipients
American Civil War recipients of the Medal of Honor